Vwaza Marsh Game Reserve is a national game reserve in Malawi.

In contrast to the Nyika National Park on the Nyika Plateau, much of Vwaza is located on low-lying flat ground although the eastern side of the park is hilly. It is located to the southeast of the plateau and to the north of the floodplains of South Rukuru River and covers an area of 1,000 km2.

The park is characterised by Mopane and Miombo woodland and marshy wetlands which attracts a significant number of birds to the reserve.

Vwaza Marsh Game Reserve is rarely visited by many, largely due to poor road conditions and difficult terrain and inaccessibility.

The variation in animal number of species type may vary from season to season as they cross the border with the North Luangwa National Park in Zambia. Typically the reserve has large herds of Cape buffaloes and elephants, and a large variety of antelope including roan, greater kudu, Lichtenstein's hartebeest, eland and impala.

Warthogs are also found in this reserve as well as a hippopotamus pod in Lake Kazuni.

Moses the orphaned elephant that now is at Jumbo Foundation elephant orphanage in Lilongwe Malawi, was rescued by rangers at Vwaza marsh in the South Rukuru river. 

Notable birdlife include Goliath herons, openbill storks and the rare white-winged starling. Lake Kazuni is located in the reserve and supports a notable hippo population.

Site has a wide variety of plants communities and there are 398 species of vascular plants from 71 families.

References

Protected areas of Malawi
Geography of Northern Region, Malawi
Important Bird Areas of Malawi
Central Zambezian miombo woodlands